Temnothorax tuberum is a species of ant belonging to the family Formicidae.

Synonym:
 Leptothorax tuberum

References

Myrmicinae